Fellows of the Royal Society elected in 1963.

Fellows

 Sir John Bertram Adams
Eric Ashby, Baron Ashby
Horace Newton Barber
Eric Henry Stoneley Burhop
Harold Garnet Callan
John William Scott Cassels
Thomas Neville George
Sir James Learmonth Gowans
Sir Peter Bernhard Hirsch
John Herbert Humphrey
Peter Leslie Krohn
Dietrich Kuchemann
Michael Selwyn Longuet-Higgins
John Freeman Loutit
John Walter Guerrier Lund
Sheina Macalister Marshall
Paul Taunton Matthews
Bernard Yarnton Mills
Charles Garrett Phillips
John Alexander Fraser Roberts
Leonard Rotherham
Thomas Stevens Stevens
Sir Theodore Morris Sugden
David Tabor
Arthur James Cochran Wilson

Foreign members

Emmanuel Faure-Fremiet
Karl Johann Freudenberg
Sewall Wright
Hideki Yukawa

Statute 12 fellow 

Sir Isaac Wolfson

References

1963
1963 in science
1963 in the United Kingdom